Buddleja loricata is a hardy evergreen shrub endemic to South Africa and Mozambique, where it grows on mountain slopes at elevations above 1,800 m. The shrub has only recently been introduced to cultivation in Europe.

Description

Buddleja loricata makes a large, bushy shrub < 4 m in height. The leaves are opposite, narrowly oblong - elliptic, < 9 cm long by 2  cm wide, the wrinkled upper surfaces dark green. The honey-scented flowers are small, pale cream with a dull orange throat, borne in clustered terminal heads from mid - autumn to winter.

Cultivation
Buddleja loricata is hardy in the UK, and considered easy to grow, being tolerant of heat, drought, and cold, and requiring very little pruning to maintain shape.  The shrub features in the NCCPG National Collection of Buddleja held by the Longstock Park Nursery, near Stockbridge, England. Hardiness: USDA zones 7–9.

Hybrids
The shrub was crossed with Buddleja crispa by Peter Moore, Longstock Park Nursery, to create the hybrid cultivar

References

 Leeuwenberg, A. J. M. (1979) The Loganiaceae of Africa XVIII Buddleja L. II, Revision of the African & Asiatic species. H. Veenman & Zonen B. V. Nederland.

Further reading

loricata
Flora of South Africa
Flora of Africa